The Afi Mountain Wildlife Sanctuary in Cross River State in southern Nigeria covers . The wildlife sanctuary was founded in 2000 to provide refuge for endangered animal species, including the Cross River gorilla, the Nigeria-Cameroon chimpanzee, the drill and the gray-necked rockfowl. 

Afi is managed by the Cross River State Forestry Commission/Ministry of Climate Change and Forestry. Although the steep mountainous slopes of the sanctuary have largely protected the forest from logging, it is frequently damaged by dry-season bush fires that are set to clear land for farming or to catch game. Open areas created by fire are quickly colonized by herb species which form an important staple food for gorillas. The largest African wintering ground of the European swallow is in the western part of the sanctuary, where an estimated 20 million of these birds roost during the winter. The Sanctuary is surrounded by 16 communities with a total population of approximately 27,000.

Protection 
In order to secure the lives of animals on the mountain, community protection patrols was put in place, the use of local hunters to discouraged shooting and trapping of animals were encouraged. Also, an education and sensitization program was organized in the 16 villages surrounding the mountain, which brought the members of communities together for the first time as a common interest group. While hunting has been kept under control in the surrounding communities through proper awareness, the Afi Mountain Wildlife Sanctuary holds a partnership with individuals to enable continuous protection of its forest and wildlife.

Features 
Afi is covered by an estimated 100km² of lowland and sub-montane forest with rocky peaks rising to altitudes of 1,300m. Although the steep mountainous slopes of the sanctuary have largely protected it from logging the forest is frequently damaged by dry-season bush fires set to clear new farms or to flush game.

Tourism 
The Afi Mountain Ranch provides accommodation for tourists in cabins. The ranch has a walkway through the forest canopy, 25 metres above the ground.

See also 
UNESCO World Heritage Sites in Nigeria

References 

Protected areas of Nigeria
Cross River State